Sinoseius is a genus of mites in the family Ameroseiidae. There are at least two described species in Sinoseius.

Species
These two species belong to the genus Sinoseius:
 Sinoseius fossatus Barilo, 1986
 Sinoseius lobatus Bai, Gu & Fang, 1995

References

External links

 

Ameroseiidae
Articles created by Qbugbot